Physiculus japonicus, known as the Japanese codling, is a bathydemersal fish found throughout waters surrounding Japan and the East China Sea.

References

Physiculus
Taxa named by Franz Martin Hilgendorf
Fish described in 1879